Margaret Murphy O'Mahony (born 3 April 1969) is a former Irish Fianna Fáil politician who served as a Teachta Dála (TD) for the Cork South-West constituency from 2016 to 2020.

She had been a member of Cork County Council for the Bandon-Kinsale local electoral area from 2014 to 2016.

She is anti-abortion and did not support the repeal of the eighth amendment. She was the Fianna Fáil spokesperson on Disability from 2016 to 2020.

She lost her seat at the 2020 general election. She unsuccessfully contested the 2020 Seanad election.

References

1969 births
Living people
Fianna Fáil TDs
Local councillors in County Cork
Members of the 32nd Dáil
21st-century women Teachtaí Dála
Alumni of Cork Institute of Technology